Monica Seles was the defending champion but did not compete that year.

Martina Hingis won in the final 6–1, 5–7, 6–1 against Jennifer Capriati.

Seeds
A champion seed is indicated in bold text while text in italics indicates the round in which that seed was eliminated. The top four seeds received a bye to the second round.

  Arantxa Sánchez Vicario (second round)
  Martina Hingis (champion)
  Iva Majoli (quarterfinals)
  Lindsay Davenport (semifinals)
  Irina Spîrlea (first round)
  Karina Habšudová (first round)
  Brenda Schultz-McCarthy (first round)
 n/a
  Amanda Coetzer (first round)

Draw

Final

Section 1

Section 2

References
 Singles and Doubles Main and Qualifying Draws

Women's Singles
Singles